Jean Maurin (born 1959) is a Général de division of the French Army and former Commandant of the Foreign Legion.

Military career

Saint-Cyrien of the promotion « Général Lasalle » (1979-1981). He was assigned as section (platoon) chief of the foreign volunteers at the 4th Foreign Regiment 4e RE in 1982, he then joined the 2nd Foreign Parachute Regiment 2e REP in 1983 in quality of a section chief, then deputy officer, and unit Commandant (Major).

In 1991, he became the chief editing officer at the employment bureau of the general staff headquarters of the Rapid Action Force. A selected trainee candidate at the Superior Course of the general staff headquarters (107th Promotion) from 1993 to 1994, he integrated the Defense Inter-arm College (2nd Promotion) from 1994 to 1995 and returned to the 2nd Foreign Parachute Regiment 2e REP as a chief instructor of the operations bureau (1995-1997).

Chief editing officer, then chef de section of the planning bureau of human resources at the general staff headquarters of the French Army from 1997 to 2000, he commanded the 13th Demi-Brigade of Foreign Legion 13e DBLE until 2002. Following this regimental command, he assumed the function of chief at the general staff headquarters of the 11th Parachute Brigade 11e BP.

In 2004, Général de division Maurin was the auditor at the academy of the general staff headquarters of the Russian Federation at Moscow. From 2005 to 2006, he was the service chief « Session Nationale » at the Institute of Superior Studies of National Defense. He then, occupied the post of section chief of « Bilatéral Nord », division « International Organizations », at the general staff headquarters of the Armies.

From 2009 to 2012, he was the attaché of the French Embassy to Moscow. Prior to assuming the command of the Foreign Legion, Général de division Maurin was the assistant and deputy of international relations of the general staff headquarters of the Armies.

He participated to Operation Manta (1983-1984), as well as Operation Epervier in Tchad (1988-1989, 1996), He was in the Central African Republic, French element of operational assistance (1985-1986), Operations Almandin II and III (1997). In 1991, he participated to Operation Noroît in Rwanda. He was present in ex-Yugoslavia (Rapid action force under mandate of the United Nations) at Sarajevo in 1995, then he took part to Operation Salamandre (1996) for the mise en place of the Dayton accords.

He then returned to Africa in 1997 in the Republic of Congo (Brazzaville) for Operation Pelican and in 2003, he was the chief of the general staff headquarters of the Unicorn Force in the Ivory Coast from October 2002 to February 2003.

In 2016, the 185th Anniversary of the Foreign Legion and the 85th Anniversary of the Commandement de la Légion Étrangère was celebrated during the tenure of général Jean Maurin.

Recognitions and Honors

See also 

Major (France)
French Foreign Legion Music Band (MLE)

References

Sources 
 Répertoire des chefs de corps
 Centre de documentation de la Légion étrangère
 Répertoire des citations (BCAAM)

1959 births
Living people
French generals
French military attachés